Daniel Potts (born 13 April 1994) is an English professional footballer who plays as a left-back or centre-back for  club Luton Town. He was capped by the United States under-20 team and the England under-18, under-19 and under-20 teams.

Club career

West Ham United
Born in Barking, Greater London, Potts joined West Ham United aged nine and signed as a scholar in May 2010. He made his reserve team debut away to Wolverhampton Wanderers on 27 April 2011, and his senior debut on 17 December in a 1–0 victory at home to Barnsley, just one day after signing a two-and-a-half-year professional contract with the club. He received the Young Hammer of the Year award in May 2012 after making four appearances in 2011–12, in which West Ham were promoted back to the Premier League after a 2–1 win over Blackpool in the 2012 Championship play-off Final at Wembley Stadium.

Potts joined League One club Colchester United on 22 November 2012 on a one-month loan. He made his debut a day later in a 5–1 defeat away to Milton Keynes Dons. The loan was extended on 21 December for a further month. Potts was recalled from his loan by West Ham on 3 January 2013 and started in their 2–2 draw with Manchester United in the FA Cup third round two days later. He made his full Premier League debut in a 3–0 defeat away to Sunderland on 12 January, in which he made an error that led to the second goal. Potts came on as a 62nd-minute substitute for Jack Collison in a 5–1 defeat away to Arsenal on 23 January but suffered concussion after a clash of heads with Bacary Sagna. He was released from hospital the next day and played no further part in 2012–13.

He signed for League Two club Portsmouth on a one-month loan on 20 November 2013. Potts debuted three days later in a 2–1 defeat to Scunthorpe United at Fratton Park. He returned to West Ham in December, having made five appearances for Portsmouth.

Potts made his first and only appearance of 2014–15 in the League Cup second round at home to Sheffield United on 26 August 2014, which West Ham lost 5–4 in a penalty shoot-out after a 1–1 draw after extra time. He was released by West Ham at the end of the season after 12 years at the club.

Luton Town
Following his release by West Ham, Potts signed for League Two club Luton Town on a two-year contract. He made his debut in a 3–1 win at home to newly promoted Championship club Bristol City in the League Cup first round on 11 August 2015. Potts suffered a hamstring injury at the end of August, making his return in a 2–1 defeat away to League One team Gillingham in the Football League Trophy second round on 6 October. He replaced Scott Griffiths in the team after Griffiths' wife gave birth to their son, making four league appearances in October. However, in the last of these matches, a 2–1 defeat at home to Plymouth Argyle, Potts picked up an injury and was substituted after 28 minutes. His next appearance did not come until 5 March 2016 when he started in a 1–0 win away to Leyton Orient in place of the injured Jake Howells. Potts then started the next two matches, but sustained an ankle injury during the latter match, a 1–0 win away to Plymouth Argyle. He made his return from injury on 9 April, starting in Luton's 2–0 defeat at home to Accrington Stanley. Potts retained his place in the team for the remainder of 2015–16 and finished the season with 16 appearances.

International career
As his father was born in the United States, Potts was presumed eligible to play for both the England national football team and the United States men's national soccer team. Potts was invited and took part in a United States under-20 camp in 2011. He made his debut for the United States under-20 team as a substitute, playing 21 minutes in a 2–1 defeat to France in a friendly in Vichy. However, in April 2012, U.S. Soccer officials determined that Potts was not eligible for U.S. citizenship, as his father did not meet residency requirements to pass along citizenship to his son, meaning he could no longer play for the United States at any level.

Potts played the first half for the England under-18 team in a 3–0 win over Poland at Crewe's Alexandra Stadium on 7 March 2012. Later that year, he progressed to the England under-19 team, playing the full 90 minutes in a 1–0 win over Finland in a friendly on 13 November. On 21 March 2013, Potts played another full 90 minutes in a 1–0 win over Turkey.

On 28 May 2013, he was named in manager Peter Taylor's 21-man squad for the 2013 FIFA U-20 World Cup. Potts made his England under-20 team debut in a warm-up match on 16 June as a 45th-minute substitute in a 3–0 win over Uruguay. He played the full 90 minutes of England's first Group E match, a 2–2 draw with Iraq on 23 June. Three days later, Potts conceded a penalty as England drew 1–1 with Chile. After receiving a yellow card in the first two group matches, Potts was suspended for the final group match against Egypt, which England lost 2–0, and were eliminated from the competition after failing to win a match.

Personal life
Potts is the son of former West Ham United captain Steve Potts and attended Marshalls Park School in Romford. His brother, Freddie, made his first-team debut for West Ham in December 2021.

At the age of 12, Potts was diagnosed with leukaemia. However, just before his 16th birthday he was given the all clear.

Career statistics

Honours
Luton Town
EFL League Two runner-up: 2017–18
EFL League One: 2018–19

Individual
Young Hammer of the Year: 2011–12
PFA Team of the Year: 2017–18 League Two

References

External links

Profile at the Luton Town F.C. website
Profile at the Football Association website

1994 births
Living people
Footballers from Barking, London
English footballers
England youth international footballers
American soccer players
United States men's under-20 international soccer players
Association football defenders
West Ham United F.C. players
Colchester United F.C. players
Portsmouth F.C. players
Luton Town F.C. players
Premier League players
English Football League players
English people of American descent